The 1999 PSA Men's World Open Squash Championship is the men's edition of the 1999 World Open, which serves as the individual world championship for squash players. The event took place in Giza, Cairo in Egypt from 10 September to 17 September 1999. Peter Nicol won his first World Open title, defeating Ahmed Barada in the final.

Seeds

Draw and results

Finals

Top half

Section 1

Section 2

Bottom half

Section 1

Section 2

See also
PSA World Open
1999 Women's World Open Squash Championship

References

External links
World Open on squashtalk.com
World Squash History

World Squash Championships
M
Men's World Open Squash Championship
Men's World Open Squash Championship, 1999
Squash tournaments in Egypt
Sports competitions in Cairo
International sports competitions hosted by Egypt
Men's World Open Squash Championship